The Autovía A-73 is a highway in Spain.

References 

A-73
A-73